Water is a scientific journal that covers water science and technology research. Topics of interest include water resources management, water quality & water scarcity etc. The journal is published by MDPI.

Abstracting and indexing 
The journal is abstracted and indexed for example in:

 AAGRIS
 CABI
 DOAJ
 Elsevier Databases (Scopus etc.)
 Web of Science

According to the Journal Citation Reports, the journal has a 2021 impact factor of 3.530.

References

External links 

 
English-language journals
Publications with year of establishment missing

MDPI academic journals